Mansfield State High School is an independent public, co-educational secondary school of approximately 3300 students located in Mansfield, a suburb in Brisbane, Australia. The school was established and opened in 1974. In recent years, the school has become prominent in the south-side region for its academic performance, as well as its specific programs including the French immersion, Music and Information Technology programs.

Campus 
The school has a sole campus in Mansfield, adjacent to Mansfield State Primary School.

A new building, C Block, was constructed in late 2014 to accommodate the introduction of 300 Year 7 students, who have joined the secondary school in a statewide effort to bring Queensland's education system in line with other Australian states. The new building features over 40 new classrooms, including computer labs, graphics classrooms and science laboratories.

A second J Block has been added and was ready for students in the early weeks of Term One, 2020. SC block (Science Center) has been built, as well as a new sports hall (SP, Sports Center). The construction for a new assembly hall is also complete.

As of writing, Mansfield State High School is the second largest secondary school in Queensland.

The school boasts two functional canteens, one coffee shop and an after school sports kiosk. It also has a well-managed and organised catering service which provides all food to personal development days, functions, and other after school activities requiring food, in particular music concerts.

Academics 
In 1990, six students received the highest possible Tertiary Entrance (TE) score possible – 990.

In 2013, 15 Year 12 students at Mansfield State High School attained an OP 1.

In 2015, the school produced an average NAPLAN score of 602, the highest in the south-side patch, outperforming the Anglican Church Grammar School (598) and the Brisbane Boys' College (591). 31% of graduates in 2015 received an OP 1–5.

In 2021, the school results were again outstanding. The results reflect the hard work from the students, staff, and parents and are definitely worth celebrating. 7 Grade 12 students received 100/100 over all 5 subjects, a further 11 achieved 99/100 over 5 subjects. 30 students achieved 25/25 in external exams in different subjects. 1 student achieved 50/50 in General Maths, 13 achieving 49/50. 10 Students achieved an ATAR greater than 99.5. 45% of students received an ATAR greater than 90.0. 

Mansfield's curriculum covers a range of disciplines including: Music; Mathematics; Film, Television and New Media; Science; English; Computer Technologies/Studies; Manual Arts; Health and Physical Education; LOTE (French or Japanese); Business Enterprise; Art; Home Economics and SOSE (Study Of Society and Environment).

Enrolment Numbers 

As of the 9th of February 2022 there are 3338 students at MSHS with 90% of them being in catchment.

Grade by Grade

Year 7: 559;

Year 8: 560;

Year 9: 610;

Year 10: 576;

Year 11: 505; 

Year 12: 528

Music

Ensembles 
The school's premier ensemble, Concert Band, has won the Queensland Music Festival for several years, and in 2006, made it to the Grand Final of Fanfare (a Queensland music competition). In the past, the band has been requested for performances such as the Commonwealth Games Torch Relay, Anzac Day ceremonies, as well as private events.  In 2013, under the direction of choral conductor Margaret Long, the school's Chorale performed in the biannual Education Queensland Choral Fanfare Gala Concert (representing the Queensland Metropolitan Region) In 2015, the senior choir, Chorale, participated in the Creative Generation State Schools on stage production as a feature choir ensemble.

Musical 
The school produces a musical biannually.

Principals 
The previous principal, Murray Kay, joined the school in 1990, the same year that the school's French Immersion program commenced.

In 2011, James Sloman became the principal after Kay retired in 2010. In 2014, Sloman oversaw the school's transition to an independent public school, before leaving.

In 2015, Karen Tanks became the principal after occupying the same role at Rochedale State High School for the previous five years. In 2018, she controversially oversaw a "clean shaven" policy for school photographs.

Sport

Many Mansfield sport teams have competed in Metropolitan Finals, and the school has also produced students and graduates who represented Australia in international events. One Mansfield alumni, Matthew Mitcham, was gold medal-winning Olympic diver.

Houses  
Mansfield students and teaching staff are allocated a house in which they remain for their entire enrollment period at the school. This allocation is organised by the first letter of their family name. The four houses' names are dedicated to people renowned for their effort in world peace:
 Hammarskjöld (gold, family names A-D)
 Gandhi (blue, E-K)
 Schweitzer (green, L-P)
 U Thant (red, Q-Z)

Alumni
The members of the successful bands The Jungle Giants and Violent Soho attended Mansfield State High School.

The top VAM student in the year 2018 achieved 25 hours over the year, including canteen duty, Valentine's day stall, TIP program, and Production Support Team.

Mansfield has also had four divers go through the school, now all representing Australia at an international level; Loudy Wiggins (Bronze Medalist at Sydney), Matthew Mitcham, Sharleen Stratton (Gold Medalist) and Scott Robertson.

See also

 Education in Australia
 List of schools in Greater Brisbane

References

External links
 

Educational institutions established in 1974
Public high schools in Brisbane
French immersion schools in Australia
1974 establishments in Australia